Colemanballs is a term coined by Private Eye magazine to describe verbal gaffes perpetrated by sports commentators. Coleman refers to the surname of the former BBC broadcaster David Coleman and the suffix -balls, as in "to balls up", and has since spawned derivative terms in unrelated fields such as "Warballs" (spurious references to the September 11, 2001, attacks), "Dianaballs" (sentimental references to Diana, Princess of Wales), "Murrayisms", (broadcasting gaffes by Murray Walker), and "Borisballs" (Boris Johnson). The all-encompassing term "mediaballs" has since been used by Private Eye as its coverage of gaffes has expanded.

Background 
The term "balls" was first associated with Coleman in 1957 when he was at BBC Midlands, Sutton Coldfield, presenting a Saturday night 15-minute roundup of the day's football in the Midlands. A technical hitch occurred and there was a black-out, but Coleman could be heard calling out to the technician in the studio, "Trust you to make a balls of that." Coleman's association with these verbal slips is so strong that he is often given erroneous credit for the earliest example specifically referenced as a Colemanballs; in fact the broadcaster responsible was a fellow BBC commentator, Ron Pickering. At the 1976 Summer Olympics in Montreal, Pickering commentated on a race involving the Cuban double-gold medallist Alberto Juantorena, whose muscular build and nine-foot stride contributed to his nickname El Caballo (the horse). Pickering said "and there goes Juantorena down the back straight, opening his legs and showing his class".

Until his retirement, motor racing commentator Murray Walker frequently featured in the column. His excitable delivery led to so many mistakes that they began to be labelled "Murrayisms". Examples include "We've had cars going off left, right and centre", "do my eyes deceive me, or is Senna's Lotus sounding rough?", "with half of the race gone, there is half of the race still to go", "There is nothing wrong with the car, apart from that it is on fire", "That car is totally unique, apart from the car behind it, which is identical", and "The gap between them is now nine-tenths of a second; that's less than a second!".

Private Eyes "Colemanballs" column has now expanded to include occasional quotes from sportsmen themselves (e.g. Frank Bruno's "That's cricket, Harry, you get these sort of things in boxing"), politicians (John Major's "When your back's against the wall it's time to turn round and fight"), and malapropisms from other public figures.

In the United States, Jerry Coleman, a former baseball player not related to David Coleman, became known for similar statements as an announcer, such as, "Rich Folkers is throwing up in the bullpen", and "Winfield goes back to the wall, he hits his head on the wall! And it rolls off! It's rolling all the way back to second base. This is a terrible thing for the Padres." In spite of these statements, which earned him the nickname "The Master of the Malaprop", he was honored by the Baseball Hall of Fame with the Ford Frick Award, their lifetime achievement award for announcers.

Books 
Private Eye has issued compilations of Colemanballs in book form

See also 
 Damaging quotation
 Malapropism
 Yogiisms
 Bushism

Footnotes 

British humour
Private Eye
1980s neologisms
Speech error
Terms for quotations of notable persons